Jason Richardson (born 1981) is an American basketball player.

Jason Richardson may also refer to:

Jason Richardson (sports personality) (born 1969), Australian radio presenter
Jason Richardson (hurdler) (born 1986), American track and field hurdler
Jason Richardson (musician) (born 1991), guitarist

See also
Jack Richardson (disambiguation)
John Richardson (disambiguation)